The 2017 NACAM Rally Championship was the tenth season of the NACAM Rally Championship. This championship was the FIA regional rally championship for the North America and Central America (NACAM) region. The season began 9 March in Leon, Mexico, and ended 25 November in Colima, Mexico, after five events held in Canada and Venezuela.

Costa Rica's two events were dropped from the championship and replaced with events in Venezuela (Rally Isla de Margarita) and a new third rally in Mexico, the Rally Colima. The Mexican round of the World Rally Championship, Rally Guanajuato Mexico was included in place of the long running RAC 1000 Rally.

Defending champion, Citroën driver Ricardo Triviño won his eighth NACAM championship. Triviño won the second and third rounds of the championship, Rally Montañas Sierra Fría Aguascalientes in Aguascalientes, Mexico and Rallye Baie-des-Chaleurs in New Richmond, Canada and was second at the season opening event Rally Guanajuato Mexico. Triviño scored no further points, but had sufficient points to be well clear of all challengers. Mitsubishi driver Francisco Díaz Mendoza finished second in the points with two second places and only just over half the points scored by Triviño. Four drivers finished tied for third place.

Event calendar and results

The 2017 NACAM Rally Championship was as follows:

Championship standings
The 2017 NACAM Rally Championship points are as follows:

References

External links

NACAM Rally Championship
NACAM
NACAM Rally Championship
NACAM Rally Championship